The Ngagyur Nyingma Nunnery is a Tibetan Buddhist nunnery in Bylakuppe, India. It is located near the Namdroling Monastery, the largest teaching center of the Nyingma lineage of Tibetan Buddhism in the world.

History
In order to give equal opportunity to women in the study and practice of Dharma, Drubwang Padma Norbu Rinpoche established the nunnery in 1993, which is situated at a distance of one kilometer from Namdroling Monastery. There are 1397 nuns who have enrolled in this nunnery so far, of which more than 681 are currently resident.  The older nuns engage themselves in the recitation and sadhanas of the Three Roots, as well as the Tsalung and Dzogchen practices.  The younger nuns enter the Jr. High School at the nunnery and study the basic Tibetan grammars and basic Buddhist teachings, after which they enter the nuns' Institute.

Branches
 Ngagyur Nyingma Nunnery Institute
 Drubnyi Gatshal Ling Retreat Center
 Junior High School
 Tsogyal Editorial Committee

References

External links
 Namdroling Website
 Tsogyal Shedrub Dargyeling Nunnery
 Palyul Ling International 

Buildings and structures in Mysore district
Tourist attractions in Mysore district